Besart Kallaku (born 20 November 1985), commonly known as Bes Kallaku is an Albanian actor, comedian, singer and retired footballer who played as a forward.

Career
Currently, he is hosting BE Cafe TV show at Klan TV. He is famously known for acting at Top Channel's famous "Portokalli", a late night comedy show and his charitable endeavours. In addition to the humorous characters he plays, Besart has debuted in two Albanian films, "The Time of Comet"  (Në kohën e Kometës) and "Alive" (Gjallë).  In 2017, Besart married Xhensila Myrtezaj and moves from Top Channel to Klan TV. Besart, lately entered the music industry by publishing his first single "Katunari Gangsta" in 2011.

Personal life
Kallaku was born in Tirana, Albania from Albanian parents, he converted to Roman Catholicism, prior to marrying his fiancé Xhensila Myrtezaj in a Church ceremony in 2017.
On December 2022, it was announced that the couple are facing disagreements on their relationship and are in a subject for a possible divorce.

Discography

Singles

2011 – "Katunari Gangsta"
2012 – "Regga Katunari" 
2012 – "Eminemi i Katunarve"
2013 – "Loku ke blloku" (feat. Rati)
2013 – "Kom me te thy n'mes"
2013 – "A ti bim o bish"
2014 – "Jeta e funit" (feat. Rati)
2014 – "Skifterat" (feat. Rati)
2015 – "Me temina" (feat. Rati & Big Mama)
2015 – "Skifterat 2" (feat. Rati)
2016 – "S3 Amsterdam" (feat. Rati)
2016 – "Unaza" (feat. Muharrem Ahmeti)
2016 – "Si mjalti" (feat. Leonard)
2017 – "Gezuar Baftjar" (feat. Ylli Baka
2017 – "N'Dashni" (feat. Olsi Bylyku)
2017 – "Skifterja Zemres" (feat. Klajdi Haruni)
2018 – "Cohu kerceni" (feat. Ylli Baka)
2018 – "Daja" (feat. Ermal Fejzullahu)
2018 – "Makarena" (feat. Irkenc Hyka)
2018 – "O bir" (feat. Dani)
2019 – "Si rrush" (feat. Fatima Ymeri)
2019 – "Ca m'ke bo" (feat. Imbro Manaj)
2020 - "KTG"
2020 - Ciao po te le (feat. Anila Mimani)
2021 - Rudina (feat. Andi Shkoza)

Selected filmography

References

External links

Bes Kallaku at the FSHF

1985 births
Living people
People from Tirana
Footballers from Tirana
Albanian footballers
Albanian male television actors
Association football forwards
KF Adriatiku Mamurrasi players
KF Korabi Peshkopi players
KF Shënkolli players
FC Kevitan players
Kategoria e Parë players
Albanian Roman Catholics
Converts to Roman Catholicism